Jens Dilling is an experimental nuclear physicist and currently the director of institutional strategic planning at Oak Ridge National Laboratory.

Life

Education 
Jens Dilling obtained both his undergraduate and doctorate degrees in physics from the University of Heidelberg in Germany. During his graduate studies, he did research at the GSI Helmholtz Centre for Heavy Ion Research and the ISOLDE Radioactive Ion Beam Facility at CERN.

Career 
Dilling began his career at TRIUMF in 2001, as an experimental nuclear physicist, eventually becoming associate laboratory director of physical sciences, where he was in charge of experimental and theoretical nuclear and particle physics, molecular and material science, scientific instrumentation, and scientific computing. His research focuses on characterizing the strong force using precise mass measurements, in particular investigating atomic physics techniques applied to nuclear physics using particle accelerators. He proposed, co-designed, and led the construction of the TRIUMF Ion Trap for Atomic and Nuclear Science (TITAN). In 2021, he became director of institutional strategic planning at ORNL, where he oversees the development of laboratory strategies, strategic investments, and annual planning. He is a member of the German Physical Society, Canadian Association of Physicists, and American Physical Society.

Publications 
His most cited publications according to Google Scholar are:

Awards 
In 2012, Dilling was named a fellow of the American Physical Society. Dilling was awarded the Canadian Association of Physicists CAP-Vogt Award in 2013.
In 2015, he was awarded the GENCO Scientific Achievement Award (membership award) of the GSI Helmholtz Centre and the European Exotic Nuclei Community. In 2017, Dilling was awarded the Francis M. Pipkin Award "for technical contributions and the use of Penning traps for the precise measurement of short-lived, radioactive nuclei such as halo nuclei and highly charged ions". Dilling received the Rutherford Memorial Medal of the Royal Society of Canada for "breakthrough discoveries in the field of experimental nuclear physics studying the fine details of the interactions of the atomic building blocks, the nucleons," in 2020.

References 

21st-century German physicists
Heidelberg University alumni
Fellows of the American Physical Society